Gwydyr House  is a Grade II* listed mansion in Whitehall, and is the London headquarters of the Office of the Secretary of State for Wales. The house lies on the eastern side of the street, opposite Dover House.

History
Gwydyr House was built for Peter Burrell of Beckenham, Kent, in 1772 at an estimated cost of £6,000.  The house is named after his son, also called Peter Burrell, who was created 1st Baron Gwydyr in 1769.  It remained privately owned until 1835 when the house became unoccupied. Between 1838 and 1840 the premises served as temporary accommodation for the Reform Club. Since 1871 Gwydyr House has been used for official purposes.

Government use
Amongst the earliest official occupants of Gwydyr House were the Commission of Fine Arts, the Commission of Revenue Inquiry and the Commission of Slave Compensation. The Secretary of State for Wales, Peter Hain, unveiled a plaque in Gwydyr House in March 2007 to mark the bicentenary of the Abolition of the Slave Trade Act of 1807.

Later in the nineteenth century, Gwydyr House was occupied by the Board of Health, the Poor Law Board and the Charity Commission. Since 1971, the premises have been occupied by the Welsh Office, later the Wales Office and now the Office of the Secretary of State for Wales. The building also houses the office of His Majesty's Lord-Lieutenant of Greater London Kenneth Olisa and the Greater London Lieutenancy.

Cultural references

On television
Gwydyr House is the location of the fictional Department for Administrative Affairs in the BBC sitcom Yes Minister. In the pilot episode "Open Government", protagonist and Minister for Administrative Affairs, Jim Hacker MP, can be clearly seen entering the oak doors opposite Dover House on Whitehall. The minister's office features a large Palladian window which offers a view of the chimneys of a Georgian home. This window is a copy of the Palladian window over the door of Gwydyr House and offers a comparable view of the chimneys of the listed Georgian mansion Dover House opposite.

References

External links

Houses in the City of Westminster
National government buildings in London
Grade II* listed buildings in the City of Westminster
Grade II* listed houses
Georgian architecture in the City of Westminster